Haplochromis igneopinnis is a species of cichlid endemic to the Tanzanian portion of Lake Victoria in the Speke Gulf.  This species can reach a length of  SL.

References

igneopinnis
igneopinnis
Fish of Tanzania
Fish of Lake Victoria
Fish described in 1998
Taxonomy articles created by Polbot